Daniel Hensel (born 17 April 1978 in Büdingen) is a German composer, VJ, musicologist and music theorist. He is known as a composer of expressive works of all musical genre's whose works can be   dedicated to "a thread of a tradition leading from Schubert via Mahler to Hensel's teacher Schedl in presence.[...]"  His style contains all kinds of material, such as traditional tonal or harmonic as well as noise and electronic material. His works are published by Musikverlag Doblinger in Vienna.

Life and work 

Hensel is a descendant from a family of musicians of light and rock music. His maternal family lives in the city of Buedingen since 1594.
Hensel began his studies of composition in 1995 as a student of the Austrian composer Gerhard Schedl at Dr. Hoch's Konservatorium. From 1999 on he studied composition with Heinz Winbeck in Würzburg, and later with Manfred Trojahn in Düsseldorf   where he graduated with distinction.  Postgraduate studies with Michael Obst followed at the Hochschule für Musik "Franz Liszt", Weimar.  He concluded his studies in musical composition in Winbeck's masterclass. In 2009 Hensel began to study musicology with Peter Ackermann and wrote a dissertation on the music of Gerhard Schedl. Hensel obtained his doctorate with "magna cum laude" on 13 July 2011.

Hensel's music was played by artists such as Carin Levine and Markus Bellheim, the Ensemble Modern, the Staatsorchester Stuttgart, and conductors such as Manfred Honeck. Several pieces were composed on behalf of festivals such as the A•DEvantgarde-Festival, young-euro.classic or Kasseler Musiktage, or institutions such as the Carl Orff Center Munich or Staatstheater Stuttgart and broadcast by several German radio stations.

In 2007, his piece "Refexions for orchestra" was the official German musical-contribution for the handover of the EU-council presidency from Germany to Portugal. The piece was played by the young sound forum of central Europe and was conducted by Sebastian Weigle. In 2008 Manfred Honeck conducted Hensel's "Chant of consecrated life" op. 18 as an "Ouverture" to the 2. Symphony of Gustav Mahler. 
In 2009 Hensel´s arrangements of the 45th Symphony by Joseph Haydn and the 8th Symphony by Ludwig van Beethoven were played by the Young Euro Classic-China-Festivalorchestra and conducted by Muhai Tang in various Chinese cities like Shanghai and Tianjin. His string sextet "Klaerchen´s Song" op.20 had its W.P. by the Ensemble Modern under Jonathan Stockhammer and was played again by the Austrian ensemble lux in the Arnold Schönberg Center Vienna in December 2010.

In 2011 he started to work with the German author and filmmaker Edgar Reitz. and one year later he started to compose electro-acoustic music besides his acoustic works.

In the same year, his dissertation concerning the music of Gerhard Schedl   was published and in 2012 he edited  Emanuel Aloys Förster´s basso continuo school including Karl Weigl´s biography on Förster.

Hensel is a member of the German composers association, the Austrian composers association, the Austrian society of contemporary music, the association of musicology, the association of music theory  and the GEMA.

Since 2013 Hensel is also performing visual arts combined with his electronic pieces.

In 2016 he obtained his post-doctoral lecturer's qualification in systematical musicology and has become a member of the philosophical faculty of Martin Luther University of Halle-Wittenberg. The title of the habilitation treatise is: "Modus, Klang- und Zeitgestaltung in Motetten Orlando di Lassos und Giovanni Pierluigi da Palestrinas". (Mode, time-management, and sound design in motets by Orlando di Lasso and Giovanni Pierluigi da Palestrina) for which the software-developer Ingo Jache and Hensel developed the music analyzing Software  PALESTRiNIZER. The treatise was published under the title "Beiträge zur Musikinformatik".

2017 Hensel also composed music for children after poems by James Krüss.  For the last two years, Hensel composed electro-acoustic works on behalf of hr2-kultur.

Personal 
Hensel and the Polish sociologist Dorota Ewa Hensel have been married since 2005 and have four children. He and his wife have been spending every summer in Radzyń Podlaski, Poland, for 16 years.

Works 

Op.16 Reflexions for orchestra composed for the Festival:
Europe, the blue star.
2222\433\Timp\Hrp\ Strings 10\8\6\4\2
Junges Klangforum Mitte Europa, Sebastian Weigle

Op.17 Concerto for piano and orchestra 2222\2\2\2\1\Timp\2Perc.\Hf\Cel\ Strings 10\8\6\4\2 WP.:06.10.08 8:00 p.m., Hochschule fuer Musik Wuerzburg

Op.18 "Chant of consecrated life", for big orchestra, on behalf of the state opera Stuttgart, dedicated to Prof. Heinz Winbeck, WP.: 12.07.08, Stuttgart,
Liederhalle, state orchestra of Stuttgart, Manfred Honeck, Conductor

Op.19 "The Young Maidservant" after poems by Georg Trakl, for Flute, Clarinet and Stringquartet WP.:02.07.10 Francfort and 02.09.10 Darmstadt, Germany, by ensemble Darmstadt, Marko Zdralek

Op.20 Stringsextet "Klärchen´s Song", dedicated to Dieter Rexroth, W.P. 11.07.09, Alte Brüderkirche Kassel, by Ensemble Modern and Jonathan Stockhammer
available at Musikverlag Doblinger, Vienna

Op.21 "Echoes and chants from the interior", dedicated to Rafal Zambrzycki-Payne

Op.22  Fleur du mal, a dramatic aria for Tenor and big orchestra, dedicated to maestro Manfred Honeck

Op.23 "Cardillac-Suite", music for the silent movie "Cardillac-Suite" for  Edgar Reitz´ "Cardillac-Suite", for Cl\Kl\Hrn\Trp\3Perc\Hrp\Cel\2Vl\2Vla\2Vcl\Cb

Op.24, No.1:  Study No.1, Music for Computers, realized with the software Csound.

Op.24, No.2:  Study No.2, Music for Computers, realized with the software Csound.

Op.25 "Duo for Violin and Violocello", "Selfdestruction and swan song",  WP: 19 April 2013, Alte Schmiede Vienna, by Marianna Oczkowska and Tomasz Skweres, available at  Musikverlag Doblinger, Wien-München

Op.28 "The apparent death", from "Des Knaben Wunderhorn", for Fl., Cl., Pf., Sopran, Vl. and Vcl, on behalf of the ÖGZM, WP: 6.23.16 at Österreichischen Kulturforum at the Austrian embassy in Berlin by Ensemble Platypus

Op.29 Trio for Violin Cello and Piano

Op.30 "Bohemian cemetery", for Soprano and Orchestra after a Poem by Jörg Bernig.

Op.31 "Cantiones Budingensis" for Computer.

Op.32 "Burn, Witch burn!" an electroacoustic composition on behalf of the hr2-kultur

Op.33 "Deaf for the wild rage of life!", Commissioned by the Philharmonic State Orchestra Hamburg, Beethoven-Spiegelung IV, for 8 woodwinds, double bass and live electronics

Op.34 "Tale from someone who set out to learn to dream", three little pieces for orchestra.

Op.35 "But where there is danger, there is also what is saving" an electroacoustic composition on behalf of hr2-kultur

Op.36 "All The King's Tags", an electroacoustic composition commissioned by hr2-kultur

Op.37 "Claustrophobia", an electroacoustic composition commissioned by the Hessian Cultural Foundation

Movies 

Study No.1 sonic Visualization of op.24 No.1

Study No.1 picturization as a video animation of op.24. No.1

Study No.2 picturization as a video animation of op.24. No.2

Awards

 2007 Gmünd/Carinthia at "Die musikalische Welt des Wassers", undoped promotional award "Recommendation" for the second stringquartet "Im Nebel" 
 2020 International Eisenach Bach Composition Prize 2020, undoped promotional award "Recommendation" for the orchestra piece "Tale from someone who set out to learn to dream", op.34

Publications

Wilhelm Friedemann Bach. Epigone oder Originalgenie, verquere Erscheinung oder großer Komponist?, Stuttgart: ibidem 2011,  
Von der Einheit in der Vielfalt oder der Lust am Subjektiven: Die Musik Gerhard Schedls, dargestellt an seiner Instrumentalmusik, Stuttgart: ibidem 2011,  
Anleitung zum General-Bass (1805), einschließlich der Biographie: Karl Weigl: Emanuel Aloys Förster (1913), Hensel, Daniel (Ed.), Stuttgart ibidem 2012,  
 Beiträge zur Musikinformatik, Modus, Klang- und Zeitgestaltung in Lassus- und Palestrina-Motetten. Springer Fachmedien, Wiesbaden 2017,  (Print),  (electronic)
 Elementar-Lehrbuch der Harmonie- und Generalbasslehre, Reprint der Ausgabe Linz 1841, mit handschriftlichen Eintragungen Anton Bruckners, kommentiert und mit einer Studie versehen von Daniel Hensel, hrg. von Andreas Lindner/Klaus Petermayr, Linz 2017, .

Essays 

 "Simon Sechter, seine Fundamentalbass-Theorie und ihre Auswirkungen auf die musikalische Konstruktion im Werk Anton Bruckners", in: Bruckner-Jahrbuch 2011 - 2014, hrg. von Andreas Lindner und Klaus Petermayr, Linz 2015, . 
 Das Handexemplar Bruckners des "Elementar-Lehrbuchs der Harmonie- und Generalbasslehre von Johann August Dürrnberger"., in: Andreas Lindner und Klaus Petermayr (Hrsg.): Brucknerjahrbuch 2015–17. Linz 2017, . 
 Der Neapolitaner und andere tonale Aspekte in Weberns op.10, Nr.4. In: Archiv für Musikwissenschaft, Band 76, Dezember 2019, Heft 4, pp 307–314.

Articles 

 Hensel, Daniel: Heinz Winbeck, in: Komponisten der Gegenwart (KDG), 65. Nflg, 12/19,  edition text+kritik München 2019 
 Hensel, Daniel: Gerhard Schedl, in: Komponisten der Gegenwart (KDG), 66 Nflg, 1/20  edition text+kritik München 2020

Radio 

 "I've done my job ... Heinz Winbeck. A broadcast by Daniel Hensel on hr2-kultur" (original: Ich hab' meine Arbeit getan…" Heinz Winbeck, eine Sendung von Daniel Hensel, auf hr2-kultur).

Discography 
Streaming and digital publishing

 Duo für Viola und Tuba op.7, Garth Knox, Gérard Buquet 
 Fünf kleine Klavierstücke, Op. 3, No. 1 (20 Years-Edition) [Live] - EP, András Hamary

Scholarships 

 2006 by Paul und Käthe Kick Foundation
 2007 Scholarship by GEMA-Foundation
 2007 Scholarship by "Musikalische Akademie Würzburg e.V. -- Gesellschaft der Freunde und Förderer der Hochschule für Musik Würzburg e.V." 
 2008 by Wolfgang Fischer und Maria Fischer-Flach Stiftung: Scholarship
 2011 by Paul und Käthe Kick Foundation
 2019 by "Förderung und Hilfsfonds" of DKV
 2020 by "Förderung und Hilfsfonds" of DKV
 2020 by InnerWheel
 2021 by "Hessische Kulturstiftung"

References

External links

 Hensel  Musikverlag Doblinger 
 Hensel, Daniel German composers association 
 Hensel in  music information center Austria 
 Hensel's curriculum vitae at young sound forum of central Europe 

 Daniel Hensel Klassika 

German composers
Living people
1978 births
People from Büdingen